Lois Dodd (born 1927 in Montclair, New Jersey) is an American painter. Dodd was a key member of New York's postwar art scene. She played a large part and was involved in the wave of modern artists including Alex Katz and Yvonne Jacquette who explored the coast of Maine in the latter half of the 20th century.

Biography
Lois Dodd received education at the Cooper Union in New York City from 1945 to 1948. She was the only woman founder of the Tanager Gallery, which was integral to the Tenth Street-avant-garde scene of the 1950s where artists began running their own coop galleries. She exhibited at Tanager Gallery from 1952 to 1962. From 1969 to 1976, she exhibited at the Green Mountain Gallery. From 1971 to 1992, Dodd taught at Brooklyn College and at the Skowhegan School of Painting and Sculpture, where she served on the Board beginning in 1980 and is now Governor Emerita.  In 1992, she retired from teaching at Brooklyn College. Since 1954, her work has been the subject of over fifty one-person exhibitions. Dodd is an elected member of the American Academy and Institute of Arts and Letters and of the National Academy of Design. She currently lives in New York and works in Maine.
In a 2011 interview, Dodd said of the original Tanager gallery: "In 1952...I was married to Bill King and we had an apartment on 29th Street. Ely was born in ’52 at just about the same time we opened the gallery. Angelo Ippolito, Charles Cajori, Fred Mitchell, King, and myself were the original group. Bill King and I were in Italy on his Fulbright where we met Angelo and Fred there on the G.I. Bill. Cajori had been at Skowhegan with Bill. We had reunited in New York after our return from Italy...It was on 4th Street in this tiny space that had been a barbershop. The elevated subway was still running up and down the Bowery. There was a bar across the street and a lot of Bowery guys were around the corner, completely different than it is now."

As part of the wave of New York modernists to explore the coast of Maine just after the end of the Second World War, Dodd helped to change the face of painting in the state. Along with Fairfield Porter, Rackstraw Downes, Alex Katz, Charles DuBack, and Neil Welliver, Dodd began spending her summers in the Mid-Coast region surrounding Penobscot Bay. Attracted by inexpensive old farmhouses, verdant fields, and the bright sunshine, they sought both companionship and an escape from the demands of city life. The break from the city and its urbane art circles allowed them the freedom to explore new modes of painting, both landscapes and figures, that were anathema in the era of Abstract Expressionism.

Work 
Dodd is known primarily for her observational paintings of landscapes, nudes and still lives. As the artist stated in an interview, "I would find it, see it, and say 'that's exciting' but I don't want to set things up." It is in her finding and framing of the everyday that something quietly original and deeply felt permeates the work. By painting her immediate circumstances, Dodd rejected the sources that others of her generation took as a given: mass media, popular culture, and the bright surfaces of a comfortable life. There is nothing glitzy about the work, neither in its subject matter nor in her use of materials. She does not celebrate excess, ownership, or leisure, nor does she condemn it. Whether or not she intends her refusals to be a comment on the work of those around her, her paintings embody an implicit critique of those who believe acquisitiveness, possession, and leisure are integral to the pursuit of happiness. She is currently represented by Alexandre Gallery in New York.

Exhibitions

Catching the light  This was the first career museum retrospective for Dodd in 2013. It features paintings that represent the places and subjects that have mattered most to her in her 60 years as an artist. They include views of New York City's Lower East Side as seen from her apartment windows and imagery from the woods and gardens of Maine, and some winter scenes by her family's home in New Jersey. The exhibition featured about 51 works that ranged in date from the 1950s to 2010s.

Other recent exhibitions include: 
 (2019) Lois Dodd: Flashings, Philipp Haverkampf Galeire, Berlin Modern Art, London
 (2019) Downtown Painting, curated by Alex Katz, Peter Freeman, Inc., New York, NY
 (2019) LandEscape: New Visions of the Landscape from the Early 20th and 21st Centuries, Katonah Museum of Art, Katonah, NY
 (2019) Lois Dodd: Paintings and Drawings, Ogunquit Museum of Modern Art, Ogunquit, Maine
 (2018) Lois Dodd: Early Work, Alexandre Gallery, New York, New York
 (2017) Lois Dodd: Windows and Reflections, List Gallery, Swarthmore College, Swarthmore, PA

In addition to her numerous exhibitions, her work remains in the collections of many art museums including Bowdoin College Art Museum; The Museum of Modern Art, New York; Cooper Hewitt Museum; National Portrait Gallery, Washington D.C.; Museo dell’Arte, Udine, Italy; The Whitney Museum Print Collection, New York; Portland Museum of Art, Portland, Maine; Wadsworth Athenaeum, Hartford, Connecticut; National Academy of Design, New York, New York; Kalamazoo Art Center, Kalamazoo, Michigan; and Knoxville Museum of Art, Knoxville, Tennessee.

Awards and honors 
Grants and Awards
 2007 Benjamin West Clinedinst Medal, Artists’ Fellowship
 2005 Augustus St. Gaudens Distinguished Alumni Award, Cooper Union
 2004 Honorary Degree Old Lyme Academy
 1991 American Academy and Institute of Arts and Letters, Hassam, Speicher, Betts and Symons Purchase Prize
 1990 National Academy of Design—Henry Ward Ranger Purchase Award
 1987 Cooper Union Distinguished Alumni Citation
 1987 National Academy of Design—Leonilda S. Gervas Award
 1986 American Academy and Institute of Arts and Letters Award
 1971 Ingram Merrill Foundation Grant
 1962 Longview Foundation Purchase Award
 1959–1960 Italian Government Study Grant

Memberships
 1998 to date American Academy & Institute of Arts & Letters
 1990–1993 Colby College Museum Advisory Board
 1988 to date National Academy of Design 
 Chairperson, Board of Governors 1986–1988, Skowhegan School of Painting and Sculpture
 Board of Governors 1980 to date, Skowhegan School of Painting and Sculpture
 1977 Board of Advisors, Artist's Choice Museum
 1972–1974 Board Member, the Lower East Side Printshop, East 4th Street, New York
 1972–1975 Chairperson, Cooper Square Community Development Committee
 1962–1975 Artist's Housing committee, Cooper Square
 1952–1962 Tanager Gallery, a founder

References

External links
 John Yau, Taking Stock of Painting Today August 2018
 https://paintingperceptions.com/conversation-with-lois-dodd/ March 2015
 https://hyperallergic.com/45378/lois-dodd-alexandre-gallery/ January 2012
 Art review: Lois Dodd done justice in Ogunquit Press Herald July 2018
 Faye Hirsch, Why Artist Lois Dodd, One of Our Keenest Observers of the Everyday World, Has Been Painting Windows for 50 Years Artnet news January 2018
 Lois Dodd exhibit at the Kemper: ‘All it is, is what I saw’; Kansas City Star June 2012
 Lois Dodd: A serious painter gets long-overdue retrospective; Lincoln Journal Star May 2012
 Art In Review; Lois Dodd 'Windows and Doorways: Paintings of Three Decades'; New York Times
 Sebastian Smee "Behind the window, beneath the hat" Boston Globe September 5, 2016
 Jennifer Samet, “Beer with a Painter: Lois Dodd” Hyperallergic March 28, 2015

1927 births
Living people
American women painters
Painters from New Jersey
People from Montclair, New Jersey
Cooper Union alumni
20th-century American painters
21st-century American painters
Brooklyn College faculty
Members of the American Academy of Arts and Letters
National Academy of Design members
20th-century American women artists
21st-century American women artists